The Lutheran Church of Saint Peter and Saint Paul (in  or in German: Lutherische Kirche der Heiligen Peter und Paul) is a Lutheran church located in Saint Petersburg, Russia.  It is one of the oldest and largest Protestant churches in Russia, and the seat of the Archbishop of the Evangelical Lutheran Church in Russia, Ukraine, Kazakhstan and Central Asia. The church have valid apostolic succession by the orthodox and lutheran episcopacy.

General
The Lutheran Church of Saint Peter and Saint Paul is a Lutheran church located on Nevsky Prospect, the main street of Saint Petersburg, Russia.

It is one of the oldest and largest Protestant churches in Russia.  It was and still is called the German church as its members were mostly German-speaking.

History

In 1705, Peter the Great decreed that the Roman Catholic and Protestant churches could be established in Saint Petersburg.

In 1708, a Lutheran church was established in Saint Petersburg, later followed by other Lutheran churches.  For example, the famous mathematician Leonhard Euler was buried in the Lutheran cemetery in Saint Petersburg.

The present building of St. Peter's Lutheran Church was designed by Alexander Brulllov and built in 1833-1837.  By 1917, the church had about 15,000 membership and also managed a school (Petrischule), a hospital and an orphanage.

During the Soviet rule, religion was persecuted.  This church was requisitioned by the local government and was used as an indoor swimming pool.

During the 1990s, the church building was returned to St. Peter's Church and was restored.

Worship

Worship is now held in Russian.  There are also services in German.

In its neighborhood
On the streets on left and right of St. Peter's Lutheran Church are:
the Evangelical Lutheran Church of Saint Mary (also called the Finnish church)
the Evangelical Lutheran Church of Saint Katarina (also called the Swedish church)
In the latter church, also held are Sunday services in English (Anglican) and in Korean (Presbyterian).
On the opposite side of Nevsky Prospect is: 
Kazan Cathedral (Eastern Orthodox)
Nearby, also on Prospect, toward east, are
the Armenian Apostolic Church of St. Catherine
the Catholic Church of St. Catherine (Roman Catholic)

References

External links
 Churches in St. Petersburg, Russia

19th-century Lutheran churches
Lutheran churches in Saint Petersburg
Nevsky Prospekt
19th-century churches in Russia
Churches completed in 1837
Cultural heritage monuments of federal significance in Saint Petersburg